Paul Maas is the name of:

 Paul Maas (classical scholar) (1880–1964), German classical scholar
 Paul Maas (botanist) (born 1939), Dutch botanist